Deva Lokesh Stanley de Silva (17 November 1956 – 12 April 1980) was a Sri Lankan cricketer. A member of Sri Lanka's tour of England and Ireland in 1979, he played two One Day Internationals in the 1979 Cricket World Cup.

Early career
Stanley de Silva was educated at Mahinda College, Galle, where he started his cricket career. He worked as an official of the Ceylon Tobacco Company.

International career
A medium-fast right-arm swing bowler of real promise, he made his ODI debut against New Zealand at Trent Bridge, Nottingham. de Silva played an important part in Sri Lanka's first ever ODI win, which was recorded over India at the 1979 Prudential World Cup match that played at Old Trafford. In that game he captured the wickets of Anshuman Gaekwad and Kapil Dev for 36 runs, after bowling 12 overs.

Death
Stanley de Silva died on 12 April 1980 at the early age of 23 in a motorcycle accident at Balapitiya, Sri Lanka. His early death was a blow to Sri Lanka's aspirations to be granted full Test status at the beginning of the 1980s.

References

External links

1956 births
1980 deaths
Sri Lankan cricketers
Sri Lanka One Day International cricketers
Motorcycle road incident deaths
Alumni of Mahinda College
Road incident deaths in Sri Lanka